Born Wild may refer to:

 An alternative title for Running Wild (1992 film)
 An alternative title for The Young Animals
 Born Wild (film), a 2001 film directed by Patrick Leung
 Born Wild, a children's documentary